Greensleeves Rhythm Album #5: Punanny is an album in Greensleeves Records' rhythm album series. It was released in November 2000 on CD and LP.  The album features the famous King Jammy's "Punanny" riddim from the 1986 Admiral Bailey hit "Punanny". The first tracks on the album feature currents artists over a re-lick version of the riddim by Ward 21, while the last 10 tracks feature artists over the original riddim.

Track listing
"Punanny Medley" - Various artists
"Pum Pum" - Elephant Man
"Roll Deep" - Beenie Man
"Chuckie Boo" - Mr. Vegas
"Haters Pt. 2" - Ward 21
"Shot Cocky" - Danny English
"Bruk Weh" - Buccaneer
"Man & Woman Fi Dance" - Anthony B
"It's All About Cash" - Lady Saw
"Get U Coffin" - Harry Toddler
"Gimme A Light" - Wayne Marshall
"Five A Day" - Ward 21
"Punanny" - Admiral Bailey
"Healthy Body" - Admiral Bailey
"Halla Fi Body" - Shabba Ranks
"Needle Eye Pum Pum" - Shabba Ranks
"Babylon Boops" - Major Worries
"Yes Mama" - Little John
"Bike Rack" - Johnny P
"Bucket A Shit" - Little Twitch
"Border Clash" - Ninjaman
"Carbon Copy" - Tiger

2000 compilation albums
Reggae compilation albums
Greensleeves Records albums